The women's long jump at the 2022 World Athletics U20 Championships was held at the Estadio Olímpico Pascual Guerrero on 3 and 5 August.

38 athletes from 29 countries were entered to the competition, however 32 athletes from 25 countries were on the final startlist.

Records
U20 standing records prior to the 2022 World Athletics U20 Championships were as follows:

Results

Qualification
The qualification round took place on 3 August, in two groups, both starting at 09:45. Athletes attaining a mark of at least 6.40 metres ( Q ) or at least the 12 best performers ( q ) qualified for the final.

Final
The final was started at 15:52 on 5 August.

References

long jump
Long jump at the World Athletics U20 Championships